Napoleón Aguilera Reyes (November 24, 1919 – September 15, 1995) was a Major League Baseball third baseman–first baseman who played for the New York Giants from 1943 to 1945, and again in 1950.  A native of Santiago de Cuba, Cuba, he stood 6'1" and weighed 205 lbs.

Reyes made his major league debut on May 19, 1943 against the Cincinnati Reds at the Polo Grounds.  He got into 40 games as a rookie, and then played regularly in 1944 and 1945.  After World War II was over, however, he got into only one more big league game.  Five years later, on April 27, 1950 he played part of a game at first base and went 0-for-1.

Career totals include 279 games played, 264 hits, 13 home runs, 110 runs batted in, 90 runs scored, and a lifetime batting average of .284.  Defensively, he fielded both of his positions very well. (.960 at third base and .991 at first base)

Reyes died at the age of 75 in Miami, Florida.

Fact
In 1945, Reyes tied for the National League lead in the hit by pitch category with 8.  The two other players who were hit 8 times were his teammate/manager and future Hall of Famer Mel Ott, and Chicago Cubs All-Star center fielder Andy Pafko.

External links 

Retrosheet

1919 births
1995 deaths
Atlanta Braves scouts
Caribbean Series managers
Cincinnati Reds scouts
Major League Baseball first basemen
Major League Baseball players from Cuba
Cuban expatriate baseball players in the United States
Major League Baseball third basemen
Milwaukee Braves scouts
New York Giants (NL) players
Morristown Red Sox players